Alla Kliouka (born 18 February 1970) is a Belarusian-Russian actress best known for her role as Svetlana Kirilenko on the HBO TV series The Sopranos. She was previously married to Ken Schaffer and is now married to Russian film director and screenwriter Vladimir Morozov. She has two children, Ivan Morozov and Kibo Schaffer.

Filmography

Film

Television

References

External links
 
 Биография Аллы Клюки на сайте Kinoexpert

Living people
Russian stage actresses
Russian film actresses
1970 births